Karl Ludwig Schemann (born October 16, 1852, in Cologne, died February 13, 1938, in Freiburg im Breisgau) was a German translator and race theorist. He promoted anti-Semitism and was instrumental in promoting Gobinism to Germany. He "did a great deal to bring Gobineau's term 'Aryan' into vogue amongst German racists".

Biography
Schemann translated An Essay on the Inequality of the Human Races by Arthur de Gobineau into German between 1893 and 1902.

Like Gobineau, Schemann thought that Europe's cultural achievement had been brought about by the "Aryan race". However, in contrast to Gobineau, he did not see the "Aryans" as doomed. According to Schemann, the acting subject in history is not only the individual, but also the race. He saw the "Aryan" race as called upon to bring about the "salvation" of mankind.

Schemann was a librarian in Göttingen from 1875 to 1891. In 1894 he founded the Gobineau Association (Gobineau-Vereinigung), which he chaired until 1920.

Together with Adolf Bartels, Arthur Moeller van den Bruck, Houston Stewart Chamberlain, Henry Thode and Hermann Hendrich, Schemann was one of the founders of the völkisch Werdandi-Bundes and was a member of the Bayreuth Circle. In addition, he was involved with other race ideologists such as the anthropologist Otto Ammon and the writer Theodor Fritsch in the Pan-German League.

Schemann was a member of the German Society for Racial Hygiene and became a vocal supporter of the Militant League for German Culture in 1928. In 1933 he was made an honorary citizen of the city of Freiburg. In 1937 he was made an honorary member of the National Socialist Institute for the History of New Germany and received the Goethe-Medaille für Kunst und Wissenschaft.

His legacy is in the University Library Freiburg.

References

1852 births
1938 deaths
Militant League for German Culture members
Translators to German
Translators from French